Al-Aʻlā (“The Most High”, “Glory To Your Lord In The Highest”) is the eighty-seventh chapter (surah) of the Qur'an, with 19 ayat or verses.

Al-A'la describes the Islamic view of existence, the Oneness of Allah, and Divine revelation, additionally mentioning rewards and punishments. Mankind often hides things from each other and from themselves as well. The sura reminds its readers that Allah knows the things that are declared and things that lie hidden. The final verse of this Sura affirms that a similar message was also revealed to Abraham and Moses in the scriptures. This sura is part of the series of Al-Musabbihat as it begins with the glorification of Allah. This is a Makkan surah. The first 7 Āyāt (verses) were revealed during the first years of Makkan life.

One of the companions of Ali said that he prayed twenty consecutive nights behind him and he did not recite any Surah, except Surah A’la. 
Surat Al-A'lā is among the most recited suras in the Jummah and Witr prayers.

Summary
1-5 God, the Most High, praised for His works
6-9 God promises to help Muhammad to proclaim the Quran
10-11 The God-fearing only shall be admonished
12-15 The wicked shall be punished, but the righteous shall be blessed
16-17 Men choose the present life rather than the life to come
18-19 The books of Abraham and Moses attest the Quran

Hadith
The first and foremost exegesis/tafsir of the Qur'an is found in hadith of Muhammad. Although scholars including ibn Taymiyyah claim that Muhammad has commented on the whole of the Qur'an, others including Ghazali cite the limited amount of narratives, thus indicating that he has commented only on a portion of the Qur'an. Ḥadīth (حديث) is literally "speech" or "report", that is a recorded saying or tradition of Muhammad validated by isnad; with Sirah Rasul Allah these comprise the sunnah and reveal shariah. According to Aishah, the life of Prophet Muhammad was practical implementation of Qur'an. Therefore, higher count of hadith elevates the importance of the pertinent surah from a certain perspective. This surah was held in special esteem in hadith, which can be observed by these related narratives. According to hadith, the prophet Muhammad used to recite this surah in Salah of Zuhr prayer, witr and in congregational prayers of Jumu'ah and in Eid prayers. And the prophet Muhammad used to recite this surah before surah Al-Ghashiyah (Sura 88). Imam Ahmad ibn Hanbal relates on the authority of Ali bin Abu Talib that Muhammad loved this surah. 

 Ibn ‘Abbas (d.687) narrated: The Prophet recited in Witr: Glorify the Name of your Lord, the Most High (Al-Ala).

 Ibn ‘Abbas reported; when the prophet recited: “Glorify the name of thy Lord, the Most High.”(Al-Ala) He would say: ”Glory be to Allah, the most High”.

 Samra ibn Jundab narrated that: The Messenger of Allah used to recite in the Friday prayer: "Glorify the name of your most high Lord" (Al-Ala) and Has the story of the overwhelming event reached you? (Al-Ghashiyah). 

 It was narrated from Ibn ‘Abbas that the Prophet used to recite in the ‘Eid prayers “Glorify the Name of your Lord, the Most High.” (Al-Ala) and “Has there come to you the narration of the overwhelming?” (Al-Ghashiyah).Sunan Abu Dawood 1122
In-book reference	 : Book 2, Hadith 733
English translation	 : Book 2, Hadith 1117

 It was narrated from al-Nu'man b. Bashir that: The Messenger of Allah  used to recite on the two Eid prayers and on Jumu'ah: "Glorify the Name of Your Lord, the Most High" (Al-Ala) and "Has there come to you the narration of The Overwhelming?"(Al-Ghashiyah) Sometimes the two ('Eid and Jumu'ah) occurred on the same day, and he would recite them (these two Surahs).

 It was narrated that Imran ibn Husain  said: "The Prophet prayed Zuhr and a man behind him recited: Glorify the Name of your Lord, the Most High. When he had finished praying, he said: 'Who recited: Glorify the Name of your Lord, the Most High?" (Al-Ala) A man said: 'I did.' He said: 'I realized that some of you were disputing with me over it'".

 Abu Bakr bin An-Nadr said: "We were in At-Taff with Anas, and he led them in praying Zuhr. When he had finished, he said: 'I prayed Zuhr with the Messenger of Allah and he recited two surahs for us in the two rak'ahs: "Glorify the Name of your Lord, the Most High' (Al-Ala) and 'Has there come to you the narration of the over-whelming?'" (Al-Ghashiyah). 

 It was narrated that Jabir said: "Muadh stood up and prayed Isha', and made it lengthy. The Prophet said: 'Do you want to cause hardship to the people, O Mu'adh; do you want to cause hardship to the people O Mu'adh? Why didn't you recite Glorify the Name of your Lord Most High (Al-Ala) or Ad-Dhuha or; When the heaven is cleft asunder?"

 Narrated Uqbah ibn Amir: “When the following was revealed: ‘So glorify the Name of your Lord, the Most Great’,[69:52] the Messenger of Allah said to us: ‘Say this in your Ruku’.’ And when the following was revealed: ‘Glorify the Name of your Lord, the Most High.’[87:1] the Messenger of Allah said to us: ‘Say this in your prostrations.’”

References

External links 
Quran 87 Clear Quran translation
 The Holy Qur'an, translated by Abdullah Yusuf Ali
 Three translations at Project Gutenberg

Ala